Pablo Adrián Guede Barrirero (born 12 November 1974) is an Argentine professional football manager and former player who played as a forward.

Playing career
Born in Buenos Aires, Guede represented local sides Deportivo Español and Nueva Chicago before moving to Spain in 1997, with Segunda División side Xerez CD. In November of that year, however, he left the club and moved to Málaga CF in Segunda División B, helping in their promotion at the end of the season.

In 1999, after achieving another promotion with Málaga, Guede signed for Elche CF in the second division. Rarely used, he moved to third level's Polideportivo Ejido in January 2001, and also achieved promotion with the side.

In January 2002, Guede joined Motril CF in division three, and subsequently resumed his career in the category, representing Real Jaén and UD Melilla. He retired from professional football with the latter in 2006, aged 31.

Managerial career

Early career
In 2006, after ending his playing spell at Melilla, Guede became the technical secretary of the very same club. He left in 2008 to become a youth manager at lowly Atlético Juval, and was also the manager of the main squad during the 2010–11 season when it returned to an active status.

On 26 January 2011, Guede was named manager of Tercera División club CD El Palo. He left the club due to personal reasons in February 2013, being replaced by his assistant Daniel Pérez Vivar; the club achieved promotion at the end of the campaign.

In November 2013, Guede signed as coach for Nueva Chicago of the Primera B Metropolitana, returning thereby his homeland Argentina following seventeen years outside. He resigned in May 2014, after leading the side back to the Primera B Nacional.

Palestino
In mid-2014, Guede moved to Primera División de Chile side Palestino. After finishing fourth in the league table and also qualified to the liguilla for enter the 2015 Copa Libertadores, he reached the team's qualification to continental contest after beat 6–1 to Santiago Wanderers at Valparaíso which broke a 37-year absence from the team at the Conmebol tournament.

At the Libertadores he reached an historical qualification to the group stage over Nacional, but once there the club failed to advance the knockout stage after finishing third behind Boca Juniors and Montevideo Wanderers F.C. from Uruguay too. On 13 November 2015, after long negotiations, it was confirmed that Guede would leave Palestino in order to undertake the coaching of the prestigious Argentine club San Lorenzo de Almagro the following season.

San Lorenzo
San Lorenzo officially named Guede as manager on 5 January 2016. He won the 2015 Supercopa Argentina with the side before resigning on 15 June.

Colo-Colo

On 15 July 2016, Guede returned to Chile after being appointed manager of Colo-Colo. He was presented at his new club three days later.

Guede led the side to the 2016 Copa Chile title in his first season, while also winning the 2017 Transición tournament and two Supercopa de Chile accolades in 2017 and 2018. On 19 April 2018, he resigned.

Al-Ahli
On 15 May 2018, Guede moved overseas and was named in charge of Saudi club Al-Ahli for two years. He was sacked the following 4 February, with the side in the fourth place in the league.

Monarcas Morelia
On 22 August 2019, Guede switched teams and countries again after being named manager of Liga MX side Monarcas Morelia. He left the club the following 24 May, amidst the COVID-19 pandemic.

Tijuana
On 19 June 2020, Guede took over Tijuana also in the Mexican first division. He resigned on 12 April of the following year, after a poor run of results.

Necaxa
On 27 September 2021, Guede was appointed manager of Necaxa. The following 8 February, he was sacked after winning only three points out of 12 in the league and being in charge for ten matches.

Málaga
On 2 April 2022, Guede replaced sacked Natxo González at the helm of former side Málaga. He was himself dismissed on 20 September, after a poor start of the new season.

Managerial statistics

Honours

Player
Málaga
Segunda División: 1998–99

Manager
Nueva Chicago
Primera B Metropolitana: 2013–14

San Lorenzo
Supercopa Argentina: 2015

Colo-Colo
Copa Chile: 2016
Chilean Primera División: 2017–T
Supercopa de Chile: 2017, 2018

References

External links

1974 births
Living people
Footballers from Buenos Aires
Argentine footballers
Argentine football managers
Argentine emigrants to Spain
Naturalised citizens of Spain
Argentine Primera División players
La Liga players
Segunda División players
Segunda División B players
Deportivo Español footballers
Nueva Chicago footballers
Xerez CD footballers
Málaga CF players
Elche CF players
Polideportivo Ejido footballers
Real Jaén footballers
UD Melilla footballers
Tercera División managers
Chilean Primera División managers
Argentine Primera División managers
Saudi Professional League managers
CD El Palo managers
San Lorenzo de Almagro managers
Nueva Chicago managers
Club Deportivo Palestino managers
Colo-Colo managers
Al-Ahli Saudi FC managers
Atlético Morelia managers
Málaga CF managers
Expatriate football managers in Chile
Argentine expatriate football managers
Association football forwards